The Last Horse (Spanish:El último caballo) is a 1950 Spanish comedy film directed by Edgar Neville starring Fernando Fernán Gómez.

Plot
Fernando, the protagonist, finishes his military service in the cavalry and decides to buy the horse that has been his companion during this time. However, living with the horse becomes a grave problem, as the city that Fernando knew is not the same. He struggles to find accommodation for the animal, and he faces resistance from both his social circle and the new, modern world.

Cast
Fernando Fernán Gómez as Fernando
Conchita Montes as Isabel
José Luis Ozores as Simón, el Bombero
Mary Lamar
Julia Lajos
Fernando Aguirre
Manuel Arbó
Manuel Aguilera
Julia Caba Alba as Julia
María Cañete
Benito Cobeña
Casimiro Hurtado
Manuel de Juan
Arturo Marín
Manuel Miranda

References

Bibliography
 Mira, Alberto. The A to Z of Spanish Cinema. Rowman & Littlefield, 2010.

External links
 

1950 films
1950 comedy films
Spanish black-and-white films
Films directed by Edgar Neville
Social realism in film
Spain in fiction
1950s Spanish-language films
Madrid in fiction
Spanish comedy films
1950s Spanish films